is a Japanese name, and may refer to:

Real people 
, a Japanese track and field athlete.

Fictional characters 
, a character in the Rurouni Kenshin series.
, a character in the Naruto series.

Places 
 Yahiko, Niigata, a village in Japan
 Yahiko Station, a train station in Yahiko, Niigata
 Yahiko Line, a Japanese rail line
 Yahiko Velodrome, a velodrome in Yahiko, Niigata

Japanese masculine given names